Pedra Azul State Park  is a state park in the state of Espírito Santo, Brazil.

Location

The park covers parts of the municipalities of Domingos Martins and Vargem Alta.
It became part of the Central Atlantic Forest Ecological Corridor, created in 2002.

Gallery

Notes

Sources

State parks of Brazil
Protected areas of Espírito Santo
Protected areas established in 1991
1991 establishments in Brazil